The Geodermatophilaceae are an actinomycete family of bacteria.

Phylogeny
The currently accepted phylogeny is based on 16S rRNA-based LTP release 123 by 'The All-Species Living Tree' Project

References

Actinomycetia
Bacteria families